Ryan Hamilton (born April 15, 1985) is a Canadian former professional ice hockey forward who played in the National Hockey League (NHL) with the Toronto Maple Leafs and the Edmonton Oilers. He spent his last three professional seasons Captaining the Bakersfield Condors of the American Hockey League (AHL).

Playing career
On July 5, 2006, Hamilton was signed as an Undrafted Free Agent by the Minnesota Wild. On January 21, 2009, he was traded to the Toronto Maple Leafs in exchange for Robbie Earl. In 2011, Hamilton was named the captain of the Toronto Marlies.

During the 2011–12 season, he made his NHL debut with the Maple Leafs on March 23, 2012 in a 4-3 win against the New Jersey Devils, registering an assist. 

After Hamilton was named MVP of the 2013 AHL All-Star Game, he was recalled to the NHL a few days later. He was also on the Leafs' playoff roster against the Boston Bruins that year. He had one assist in two games.  On July 5, 2013, the Edmonton Oilers signed him to a two-year deal where he was reunited with former Toronto Marlies head coach Dallas Eakins. He scored his first NHL goal on February 10, 2015, in a 3–2 loss to the New York Islanders.

After three seasons within the Oilers organization, Hamilton opted to remain with affiliate, the Bakersfield Condors, signing a two-year AHL contract on April 27, 2016.

Upon completing his third season with the Condors in 2017–18, Hamilton ended his 12-year professional career in accepting a pro scouting position with the San Jose Sharks on July 31, 2018.

Career statistics

Awards and honours

References

External links

1985 births
Bakersfield Condors players
Barrie Colts players
Canadian ice hockey left wingers
Edmonton Oilers players
Houston Aeros (1994–2013) players
Living people
Moose Jaw Warriors players
Oklahoma City Barons players
San Jose Sharks scouts
Sportspeople from Oshawa
Toronto Maple Leafs players
Toronto Marlies players
Undrafted National Hockey League players